Victor Diagne (born 5 July 1971) is a Senegalese footballer. He played in eight matches for the Senegal national football team from 1992 to 1996. He was also named in Senegal's squad for the 1992 African Cup of Nations tournament.

References

External links
 

1971 births
Living people
Senegalese footballers
Senegal international footballers
1992 African Cup of Nations players
Place of birth missing (living people)
Association football forwards
Senegalese expatriate footballers
Expatriate footballers in Belgium
ASC Jaraaf players
Beerschot A.C. players